Leopoldo Alfredo Bravo (30 July 1960 – 30 October 2010) was an Ambassador Extraordinary and Plenipotentiary of the Argentine Republic to the Russian Federation.

The son of Leopoldo Bravo, a former Ambassador of Argentina to the Soviet Union and powerful San Juan Province political figure, Bravo served in the Provincial Legislature on his father's Partido Bloquista ticket from 1987 to 1993, and in the Argentine Chamber of Deputies from 1995 to 1999. He returned to the San Juan Legislature, and in 2002, was named Financial Attaché to the Argentine Embassy in Moscow.

Bravo was designated Ambassador to the Russian Federation on September 12, 2006 (a post his father had held during Juan Perón's last presidency, in 1973–74). He served concomitantly as Ambassador to Ukraine from 2007, and from 2008, in Armenia, Kazakhstan, Kyrgyzstan, and Turkmenistan.

He died of cancer on 30 October 2010 at the age of 50; he was survived by his wife, Laura Adámoli, and their four children.

See also 
 Embassy of Argentina in Moscow

References 

1960 births
2010 deaths
Members of the Argentine Chamber of Deputies elected in San Juan
Argentine diplomats
Ambassadors of Argentina to Russia
Deaths from cancer in Argentina